Sea Stallion may refer to:

 CH-53 Sea Stallion, a Sikorsky S-65 helicopter
 Sea Stallion from Glendalough, a replica of the Viking ship Skuldelev 2